Komsomolskaya Square, known as Kalanchyovskaya before 1932, is a square in Moscow, with a blend of revivalist Tsarist and Stalinist architecture. It is referred to informally as Three Station Square (lit. "Ploshchad' tryokh vokzalov") after the three rail termini situated there: Leningradsky, Yaroslavsky, and Kazansky. These stations connect Moscow with Saint Petersburg, northwestern Russia, the Volga region, and Siberia via the Trans-Siberian Railway.

Its origins lay with the construction of the Moscow-Saint Petersburg Railway in the 1840s, when Kalanchyovskoye Field outside the Garden Ring was selected to allocate the Nicholas Railway Station (later renamed Leningradsky). In 1862 the Yaroslavsky Rail Terminal, a terminus of the Trans-Siberian Railway, was constructed nearby. On the opposite side of the field the Kazansky Rail Terminal was inaugurated two years later. Until 1909, a railway line leading to Kursky Rail Terminal traversed the square; it is now elevated so as not to interfere with street traffic.

During the Soviet period, four other structures were added. Alexey Shchusev designed a Constructivist edifice, the Central Club of Railway Workers, in 1925–1926. The square received its present name, in the honour of the Komsomol (Communist Union of Youth) members, in 1932. A Stalinist skyscraper of the Hilton Moscow Leningradskaya Hotel and a Neoclassical vestibule of the Komsomolskaya-Koltsevaya metro station were completed in the early 1950s. The most recent addition is the Moskovsky department store on the eastern side of the square (1983).

In 2003, at the behest of the Ministry of Transportation, a bronze statue of Pavel Melnikov (1804–1880) was erected on the square. Melnikov was the Russian minister of transportation who oversaw the construction of the first railways in Russia.

See also
This square is not the only place in Europe, where is available interchange with many of major interchange stations. St Pancras railway station, Euston railway station and London King's Cross railway station in London are located similarly to Moscow stations at Komsomolskaya Square.
In France, Gare du Nord and Gare de l'Est in Paris are also located nearby.

External links
 Description and photographs
Virtual tour of Komsomolskaya Square

Squares in Moscow